Sarola Brahmin, also called Saryul and Serul are Garhwali Brahmins from Uttarakhand, India. Sarola Brahmins were the earliest authenticated Brahmin castes in the then small Garhwal Kingdom 1200 years ago. The capital of this kingdom was Chandpur Garhi and twelve castes of Brahmins settled in twelve villages surrounding the capital. Each of this Brahmin faction have their own Kuladevata or Kuladevi. They settled as rajpurohits, royal astrologers, priests, cooks, gurus, and as royal advisors. Along with this they were also designated the task of cooking food on auspicious occasions and also on royal occasions by the King of Garhwal, thus named "Sarola" (Garhwali for cook). These twelve villages were collectively known as "Bara Than" meaning "Barah Sthan", and the Brahmins living in these villages were known as "Sarola" Brahmins.

See also
 Gangari Brahmin

References 

Brahmin communities of Uttarakhand
Garhwal division